Events from the year 1869 in Germany.

Incumbents
 King of Bavaria – Ludwig II
 King of Prussia – William I
 King of Saxony – John
 King of Württemberg – Charles of Württemberg
 Grand Duke of Baden – Frederick I

Events
 9 May – The German Alpine Club is founded
 15 June – The Second German North Polar Expedition departs from Bremerhaven
 20 August – Kunsthalle Hamburg opened.
 5 September – The foundation stone is laid for Neuschwanstein Castle in Bavaria

Undated
First Deutsches Derby horse race takes place

Births
 25 January – Max Hoffmann, German general (died 1927)
 3 February – Johann Becker, German politician (died 1951)
 8 March – Rudolf Wissell, politician (died 1962)
 15 February – Hans Schrader, German archaeologist (died 1948)
 11 May – Erhard Riecke, German dermatologist and venereologist (died 1939)
 12 May – Carl Schuhmann, German gymnast (died 1946)
 18 May – Rupprecht, Crown Prince of Bavaria, German nobleman (died 1955)
 29 May – Ulrich von Brockdorff-Rantzau, German diplomat (died 1928)
 6 June – Siegfried Wagner, German composer and conductor (died 1930)
 27 June – Hans Spemann, German embryologist, Nobel Prize in Physiology or Medicine (died 1941)
 13 August – Paul Behncke, German admiral (died 1937)
 31 August – Carl von Opel, German automotive pioneer (died 1927)
 22 October – Oskar Hergt, German politician (died 1967)
 4 November – Fritz Schumacher, German architect (died 1947)
 4 December – Otto Landsberg, German politician (died 1957)

Deaths 
 19 January – Carl Reichenbach, German chemist, geologist, metallurgist, naturalist, industrialist and philosopher (born 1788)
 8 February – Karl Gildemeister, German architect (born 1820)
 10 March – Carl Theodor Welcker, German journalist and politician (born 1790)
 11 March – Christian August II, Duke of Schleswig-Holstein-Sonderburg-Augustenburg, German nobleman (born 1798)
 2 April – Christian Erich Hermann von Meyer, German palaeontologist (born 1801)
 15 July – Carl Friedrich Wilhelm Duncker, German publisher (born 1781)
 22 July – Julius Braun, German historian (born 1825)
 12 November – Johann Friedrich Overbeck, German painter (born 1789), died in Italy
 22 November – Carl Ferdinand Langhans, German architect (born 1782)
 24 November – Anton Westermann, German philologist (born 1806)

 
Years of the 19th century in Germany
Germany
Germany